Harald Böhmelt (1900–1982) was a German composer of film scores.

Selected filmography
 A Girl You Don't Forget (1932)
 Little Man, What Now? (1933)
 Little Girl, Great Fortune (1933)
 Charley's Aunt (1934)
 Love Conquers All (1934)
 Love and the First Railway (1934)
 The Girlfriend of a Big Man (1934)
 Such a Rascal (1934)
 The Valiant Navigator (1935)
 The Abduction of the Sabine Women (1936)
 I Was Jack Mortimer (1935)
 Susanne in the Bath (1936)
 Crooks in Tails (1937)
 The Tiger of Eschnapur (1938)
 The Indian Tomb (1938)
 Woman at the Wheel (1939)
 U-Boote westwärts! (1941)
 The Thing About Styx (1942)
 Kohlhiesel's Daughters (1943)
 Scandal at the Embassy (1950)
 Once on the Rhine (1952)
 Love's Awakening (1953)
 I'll See You at Lake Constance (1956)
 The Red Hand (1960)

References

Bibliography 
 Giesen, Rolf.  Nazi Propaganda Films: A History and Filmography. McFarland, 2003.

External links 
 

1900 births
1982 deaths
People from Halle (Saale)
German film score composers